Marko Šimić or Marko Simic may refer to:

 Marko Šimić (skier), Slovenian nordic combined skier born 1982
 Marko Šimić (footballer, born 1985), Croatian football goalkeeper
 Marko Šimić (footballer, born 1988), Croatian football striker
 Marko Simić (born 1987), Montenegrin football defender